Beverly A. Clarno (born March 29, 1936) is an American politician who served as the 27th Oregon Secretary of State from 2019 to 2021. She was the only Republican statewide official in Oregon at the time. Clarno previously served as a member of the Oregon House of Representatives and Oregon State Senate. , she is the most recent Republican to have held statewide office in Oregon.

Early life and education 
Clarno was born in Langlois, Oregon. She earned a Bachelor of Arts degree from Marylhurst University.

Career 
Clarno was elected to the Oregon House of Representatives in 1989. She became Speaker of the House in 1995, succeeding Larry Campbell. She served in the House until 1996, opting to instead run for Oregon State Treasurer, though she was defeated by incumbent Democrat Jim Hill.

In 2000, she was elected to the Oregon State Senate, where she served one term. She resigned on August 1, 2003 to take a position with the George W. Bush administration as a regional representative for the United States Department of Health and Human Services.

Governor Kate Brown appointed Clarno as Oregon Secretary of State to complete the term of Dennis Richardson following his death in 2019. Brown announced that she was only interested in appointing a successor to Richardson who wanted the day-to-day responsibilities of the office and would not run for election to a full term, a condition to which Clarno agreed upon her appointment. As Oregon does not have a Lieutenant governor position, the Secretary of State serves in a similar role and is first in the line of succession to the Governor. As Clarno was an appointee, however, she was ineligible to become Governor, leaving State Treasurer Tobias Read next in the line of succession until Shemia Fagan assumed office on January 4, 2021.

References

See also 
 List of speakers of the Oregon House of Representatives

|-

1936 births
20th-century American women politicians
20th-century American politicians
21st-century American women politicians
21st-century American politicians
George W. Bush administration personnel
Lewis & Clark College alumni
Living people
Marylhurst University alumni
Republican Party members of the Oregon House of Representatives
Republican Party Oregon state senators
People from Curry County, Oregon
Politicians from Bend, Oregon
Ranchers from Oregon
Secretaries of State of Oregon
Speakers of the Oregon House of Representatives
United States Department of Health and Human Services officials
Women legislative speakers
Women state legislators in Oregon